COMC may refer to:
 Canadian Open Mathematics Challenge, competition
 L-2-hydroxycarboxylate dehydrogenase (NAD+), enzyme
 (2R)-3-sulfolactate dehydrogenase (NADP+),  enzyme